Elisha Dickerson Cullen (April 23, 1799 – February 8, 1862) was an American lawyer and politician from Georgetown, in Sussex County, Delaware. He was a member of the American Party, who served as U. S. Representative from Delaware.

Early life and family
Cullen was born in Millsboro, Delaware, attended Princeton College, studied law, was admitted to the Delaware Bar in 1821 and commenced practice in Georgetown, Delaware. His sons included Charles M. Cullen, an Associate Justice from Sussex County and his grandsons included a lawyer, Charles W. Cullen.

Professional and political career
He was elected as the candidate of the American Party to the 34th Congress, but was an unsuccessful candidate for reelection in 1856 to the 35th Congress. Consequently, he resumed the practice of law in Georgetown. He was a slaveholder.

Death and legacy
Cullen died at Georgetown, and is buried in the Presbyterian Church Cemetery at Lewes, Delaware.

Almanac
Elections are held the first Tuesday after November 1. U.S. Representatives took office March 4 and have a two-year term.

References

External links
Biographical Directory of the United States Congress 
Delaware’s Members of Congress 
Find a Grave
The Political Graveyard

1799 births
1862 deaths
People from Georgetown, Delaware
American Presbyterians
Delaware lawyers
Members of the United States House of Representatives from Delaware
Burials in Sussex County, Delaware
Know-Nothing members of the United States House of Representatives from Delaware
People from Millsboro, Delaware
19th-century American lawyers